Zbigniew Jan Niewiadomski (born February 18, 1946 in Ruda, Wieluń County) is a Polish sprint canoeist who competed in the early 1970s. He was eliminated in the semifinals of the K-4 1000 m event at the 1972 Summer Olympics in Munich.

References
 Sports-reference.com profile

1946 births
Canoeists at the 1972 Summer Olympics
Living people
Olympic canoeists of Poland
Polish male canoeists
People from Wieluń County
Sportspeople from Łódź Voivodeship